Washington Township is one of nine townships in Decatur County, Indiana. As of the 2010 census, its population was 13,304 and it contained 5,944 housing units.

History
Washington Township was organized in 1822.

Strauther Pleak Round Barn was added to the National Register of Historic Places in 1993.

Geography

Cities and towns
 Greensburg

Unincorporated towns
 Craig
 Knarr Corner
 McCoy
 Middle Branch
(This list is based on USGS data and may include former settlements.)

Adjacent townships
 Clinton Township (north)
 Fugit Township (northeast)
 Salt Creek Township (east)
 Marion Township (south)
 Sand Creek Township (southwest)
 Clay Township (west)
 Adams Township (northwest)

Major highways
  Interstate 74
  U.S. Route 421
  Indiana State Road 3
  Indiana State Road 46

Cemeteries
The township contains five cemeteries: Forsythe, Saint Marys, Sand Creek, South Park and Springer.

References
 United States Census Bureau cartographic boundary files
 U.S. Board on Geographic Names

External links

 Indiana Township Association
 United Township Association of Indiana

Townships in Decatur County, Indiana
Townships in Indiana
1822 establishments in Indiana
Populated places established in 1822